Richard Eidestedt (born 20 June 1987) is an English male badminton player, and currently plays for Sweden. In 2008, he won the Irish, Le Volant d'Or, and Scotland International tournaments in the men's doubles event partnered with Andrew Ellis. In 2016, he and Nico Ruponen had to battle through the qualification round at the Orleans International tournament before reach the finals, finally they won the men's doubles title after beat Hardianto and Haryanto of Indonesia.

Achievements

BWF International Challenge/Series
Men's Doubles

 BWF International Challenge tournament
 BWF International Series tournament
 BWF Future Series tournament

References

External links
 

1987 births
Living people
English male badminton players
Swedish male badminton players